The WTA 1000 Mandatory and non-Mandatory tournaments, which are part of the WTA 1000 tournaments, make up the elite tour for professional women's tennis organised by the WTA called the WTA Tour. There are four 1000 Mandatory tournaments: Indian Wells, Miami, Madrid and Beijing and five non-Mandatory tournaments: Doha, Rome, Canada, Cincinnati, Wuhan and Guadalajara, held only this year as a substitute for Wuhan and Beijing.

Tournaments

Results

Tournaments details

Qatar Open

Singles

Doubles

Indian Wells Open

Singles

Doubles

Miami Open

Singles

Doubles

Madrid Open

Singles

Doubles

Italian Open

Singles

Doubles

Canadian Open

Singles

Doubles

Western & Southern Open

Singles

Doubles

Guadalajara Open

Singles

Doubles

See also 
 WTA 1000 tournaments
 2022 WTA Tour
 2022 ATP Tour Masters 1000
 2022 ATP Tour

References

External links
 Women's Tennis Association (WTA) official website
 International Tennis Federation (ITF) official website

WTA 1000 tournaments